George Hutchins may refer to:

 Sir George Hutchins (lawyer) (died 1705), English lawyer and politician
 George Hutchins (priest) (1909–1977), archdeacon of Cheltenham
 George Hutchins, Gulf war veteran and U.S. congressional candidate, see United States House of Representatives elections in North Carolina, 2010

See also
 George Hutchinson (disambiguation)